A mangle or wringer is a mechanical laundry aid consisting of two rollers in a sturdy frame, connected by cogs and (in its home version) powered by a hand crank or by electricity. While the appliance was originally used to wring water from wet laundry, today mangles are used to press or flatten sheets, tablecloths, kitchen towels, or clothing and other laundry.

History

Clothes press

The Oxford English Dictionary dates the first use of the word in English from 1598, quoting John Florio who, in his 1598 dictionary, A World of Words, described "a kind of press to press buckram, fustian, or dyed linen cloth, to make it have a luster or gloss". The word comes from the Dutch mangel, from mangelen "to mangle", which in turn derives from the medieval Latin mango or manga which ultimately comes from the Greek manganon, meaning "axis" or "engine". Some northern European countries used a table version for centuries, the device consisting of the rolling pin, a wood cylinder around which the damp cloth was wrapped, and the mangle board, a curved or flat length of wood which was used to roll and flatten the cloth. The oldest known model is a Norwegian mangle board, found near Bergen and dated 1444.

In the second half of the 19th century, commercial laundries began using steam-powered mangles or ironers. Gradually, the electric washing machine's spin cycle rendered this use of a mangle obsolete, and with it the need to wring out water from clothes mechanically. Box mangles were large and primarily intended for pressing laundry smooth; they were used by wealthy households, large commercial laundries, and self-employed "mangle women". Middle-class households and independent washerwomen used upright mangles for wringing water out of laundry, and in the later 19th century they were more widely used than early washing machines. The rollers were typically made of wood, or sometimes rubber.

The Steel Roll Mangle Co. of 108 Franklin Street, Chicago, Illinois, offered a gas-heated home mangle for pressing linens in 1902. In the 1930s electric mangles were developed and are still a feature of many laundry rooms. They consist of a rotating padded drum which revolves against a heating element which can be stationary, or can also be a rotating drum. Laundry is fed into the turning mangle and emerges flat and pressed on the other side. This process takes much less time than ironing with the usual iron and ironing board.

There were many electric rotary ironers on the American market including Solent, Thor, Ironrite and Apex. By the 1940s the list had grown to include Bendix, General Electric, Kenmore and Maytag. By the 1950s, home ironers, or mangles, as they came to be called, were becoming popular time-savers for the homemaker.

Drying clothes

When home washing machines were first invented, they were just for washing: a tub on legs or wheels. A hand-cranked mangle appeared on top after 1843 when John E. Turnbull of Saint John, New Brunswick patented a "Clothes Washer With Wringer Rolls". The first geared wringer mangle in the UK is thought to date to about 1850, when one was invented by Robert Tasker of Lancashire. It was a smaller, upright version of the box mangle.

Current use 

Small domestic pressing mangles may be more common in some countries than in others. They are typically not sold in North American home appliance stores or departments. In contrast to their use in homes, mangles have become an essential feature of commercial or large-scale laundries. They are typically used to press flat items such as sheets or tablecloths, and also are far quicker and more energy-efficient for removing most of the water than a clothes dryer. Skilled operators can also press shirts and trousers on a mangle.

A significant benefit of mangling is reduced dust. When washing, the ends of the surface fibers tend to loosen and stick out when dried. The clothes are then much more sensitive to trap dust, dirt and grease, and to shed off fibers. Mangling presses the fiber ends back onto the fiber, so that the clothes remain clean longer. This could potentially reduce dust approximately 10 to 60 times; however, this is not confirmed. Mangles are most often used for bed sheets, tablecloths and towels, which would be time-consuming to iron by hand.

Artistic use 
Artists, such as Barbara Brash have adapted mangles to serve as printing presses, which they resemble in construction. By fixing a metal platen, on which printing plate and paper are placed, permanently between the rollers, which themselves may be replaced by, or sheathed in, turned metal cylinders; they thus make a serviceable and much less expensive alternative to a commercial cylinder etching press.

See also
 List of home appliances
 Cold pad batch

References

External links

 Boston Public Library. Laundry Trade Cardz, including 19th-century advertisements for wringers.

Laundry equipment
Laundry drying equipment